Barnabás Berzsenyi (12 February 1918 – 18 June 1993) was a Hungarian fencer. He won a silver medal in the team épée event at the 1956 Summer Olympics.

References

External links

1918 births
1993 deaths
Hungarian male épée fencers
Olympic fencers of Hungary
Fencers at the 1952 Summer Olympics
Fencers at the 1956 Summer Olympics
Olympic silver medalists for Hungary
Olympic medalists in fencing
Medalists at the 1956 Summer Olympics
20th-century Hungarian people